Elzevir Lake is a lake in the Moira River and Lake Ontario drainage basins in Tweed, Hastings County, Ontario, Canada.

The primary inflow is Elzevir Creek from an unnamed lake at the northwest; it is also the primary outflow at the southeast to an unnamed lake. The creek flows via the Skootamatta River and Moira River into the Bay of Quinte on Lake Ontario at Belleville.

See also
List of lakes in Ontario

References

Lakes of Hastings County